Françoise Henneron (born 3 February 1948) is a French politician and a member of the Senate of France. She represents the Pas-de-Calais department and is a member of the Union for a Popular Movement Party.

References
Page on the Senate website

1948 births
Living people
French Senators of the Fifth Republic
Union for a Popular Movement politicians
Women members of the Senate (France)
21st-century French women politicians
Senators of Pas-de-Calais